Craig Brian Lawford (born 25 November 1972) is an English former professional footballer who played as a midfielder.

Career
Born in Dewsbury, Lawford played for Bradford City, Hull City and Liversedge.

Career statistics

References

1972 births
Living people
English footballers
Bradford City A.F.C. players
Hull City A.F.C. players
Liversedge F.C. players
English Football League players
Association football midfielders